Matthew Cullen (1864-1936) was an Irish Catholic priest and Bishop of Kildare and Leighlin.

Life
Matthew Cullen was born in Kilcarney, County Wicklow in the parish of Hacketstown on St. Patrick's Day, 1864 to Matthew and Elizabeth Kehoe Cullen. He commenced his clerical studies in St. Patrick's, Carlow College, and continued them in Maynooth.
He was ordained in 1889 and served initially as a curate in Geashill, Killeigh and the Tinyland, he served as chaplain to the Curragh Army camp.

Career and activities 
Cullen served as rector to St. Mary's Knockbeg College from 1895 until 1909, when he moved to Newbridge, prior to being appointed parish priest of Tinyland and then Bangelstown before being elected a bishop.

He was a keen supporter of Gaelic Games and regularly attended GAA matches in Kildare and Carlow.

In 1927 he was appointed Bishop of Kildare and Leighlin, succeeding Dr. Patrick Foley and served until his death. On 30 November 1933 Bishop Cullen consecrated the Cathedral of the Assumption in Carlow.

Cullen encouraged and facilitated the establishment of St Patrick's Missionary Society at Kiltegan.

Death 
He died on 2 January 1936. Following his death Carlow GAA Stadium, which had just been completed, was named Dr. Cullen Park in his honour.

References

1864 births
1936 deaths
20th-century Roman Catholic bishops in Ireland
People from County Wicklow
Alumni of Carlow College
Alumni of St Patrick's College, Maynooth